Psychology Today is an American media organization with a focus on psychology and human behavior. It began as a bimonthly magazine, which first appeared in 1967. The Psychology Today website features therapy and health professionals directories and hundreds of blogs written by a wide variety of psychologists, psychiatrists, social workers, medical doctors, anthropologists, sociologists, and science journalists.

Online presence and magazine circulation 
Psychology Today is among the oldest media outlets with a focus on behavioral science. Its tagline is “Here to Help” and its mission is to cover all aspects of human behavior so as to help people better manage their own health and wellness, adjust their mindset, and manage a range of mental health and relationship concerns.

Psychology Today content and its therapist directory are found in 20 countries worldwide. Psychology Today's therapist directory is the most widely used and allows users to sort therapists by location, insurance, types of therapy, price, and other characteristics. It also has a Spanish-language website.

The print magazine's circulation is 250,000, with 15.02 readers per copy, totaling an audience of 3.75 million.

History and mission
Founded in 1967 by Nicolas Charney, Ph.D., to make the burgeoning psychology literature accessible to the general public, Psychology Today features reportage and information that looks inward at the workings of the brain as well as outward to the bonds between people. It draws on research reports and interviews with experts on topics ranging from human motivation to personality development, from intelligence to child development and parenting practices, from schizophrenia to sexuality, from leadership to addiction, from anxiety to politics—the vast range of the human behavior, with coverage of animal behavior as well.

With articles on groupthink by Irving Janis, Ph.D., learned helplessness by Martin Seligman, Ph.D., and management by Peter Drucker, Psychology Today earned a wide readership among professionals and the public. Psychologist Abraham Maslow described his ideas on peak experiences and self-actualization in Psychology Today. Other articles explored biofeedback, brain imaging, body language, and the halo effect of beauty.

The magazine was among the bestselling general interest periodicals on the market: In 1976 Psychology Today sold 1,026,872 copies. The circulation of the magazine was 1,171,362 copies in 1981 and 862,193 copies in 1986.

In 1992, after several changes in ownership and a publishing hiatus of two years, Psychology Today resumed publication as a general magazine, adding distinguished science journalism to cover a rapidly expanding field of human knowledge. Culturally relevant articles on bullying, bias, and behavioral economics join the now-famous Hare checklist of psychopathy and portraits of perfectionism. The magazine has won numerous awards from the Society of Publication Designers. 

From June 2010 to June 2011, it was one of the top ten consumer magazines by newsstand sales. 

The Psychology Today website, in addition to archiving magazine articles since 1992, features a continuous stream of blogs by laboratory researchers, clinical practitioners, and writers with a broad range of expertise. Daily reports of the findings of new research on human behavior accompany accounts of common concerns and explorations of the impact of current events on mental health. The website is also the primary portal to a comprehensive directory of psychologists, psychiatrists, and other mental health professionals in the U.S. and around the world. The New York Times recommends this therapist finder when considering the costs involved in seeking therapy.

Leadership
From 1983 to 1987, Psychology Today was owned and managed by the American Psychological Association. It is currently owned by Sussex Publishers.

Content and standards 
The magazine is not peer-reviewed, but all expert author content is reviewed, edited and fact-checked for accuracy, objectivity and to ascertain that the author has relevant domain expertise by the editorial staff. Psychology Today features many of its contributors as experts in their fields who hold academic degrees.

Editors in chief
 Anastasia Toufexis, 1998–1999
 Robert Epstein, 1999–2003
 Kaja Perina, 2003–present

References

Further reading

External links

1967 establishments in California
Bimonthly magazines published in the United States
Science and technology magazines published in the United States
Health magazines
Magazines established in 1967
Magazines published in California
Magazines published in New York City
Popular psychology magazines